Eswatini is home to several languages. Native languages are SiSwati, Zulu, Tsonga, Afrikaans, and English. Recent immigrant languages include Chichewa and Southern Sotho.

National and official languages 
Swazi, a Southern Bantu language, is the national language of Eswatini, and is spoken by approximately 95 percent of Swazis. Swazi and English are the country's two official languages, and proceedings of the Parliament of Eswatini take place in both languages.

Swazi language education is present in all national schools, and literacy in Swati—defined as the ability to read and write the language—is very high in Eswatini. Swazi is also used in mass media.

English is the medium of instruction, and is taught in all public and private schools. Competency in English is a prerequisite for admission into most post-secondary institutions.

Minority and immigrant languages 
A minority of Swazi people, estimated to number 76,000 , speak Zulu, one of the eleven official languages of South Africa. Tsonga, a Tswa–Ronga language and also an official language of South Africa, is spoken by 19,000 Swazis. Afrikaans, another official language of South Africa and descended from Dutch, is spoken by 13,000 people in Eswatini.

Chewa, an official language of Malawi, and Sotho (Sesotho or Southern Sotho), spoken mainly in Lesotho and the South African province of Free State, are immigrant languages with 5,700 and 4,700 speakers respectively. Shimaore is also an immigrant language and is spoken by 600 inhabitants.

Prior to Eswatini's independence in 1968, French was taught in the colony's three white-only high schools.

See also 
 Languages of Lesotho
 Languages of Mozambique
 Languages of South Africa

Notes

References